The Army of the Danube (or Danube Army; alternately the Army of Moldavia) was a field army of the Russian Empire, created for the Russo-Turkish War of 1806–1812.

Commanded by Admiral Pavel Chichagov from May 1812, it merged with the Third Reserve Army of Observation to form the Third Western Army in September during the French invasion of Russia.

History 
While waiting for news of the Ottoman sultan's ratification of the treaty, Chichagov proposed to attack Constantinople, but this plan was dropped after the treaty was ratified. On  Tsar Alexander I instructed Chicagov to use his army to attack Napoleon's rear and force Austria out of the war by encouraging a Slavic revolt and advancing to the Adriatic Sea. These plans were abandoned due to diplomatic communications between Russia and Austria that revealed that the Austrian contribution to the invasion would be limited to 30,000 men. The chief of staff of the army was Lieutenant General Ivan Sabaneyev, while Major Generals Sergey Tuchkov and Burhardt Berg held the positions of duty general and quartermaster general, respectively. It included the following units:

 1st Corps (General of the infantry Alexandre Langeron)
 22nd Infantry Division (less Olonets Infantry Regiment)
 18th Brigade of the 6th Cavalry Division
 14th Horse Artillery Company
 Grekov IV Don Cossack Regiment
 Panteleyev II Don Cossack Regiment
 7th Pontoon Company
 2nd Corps (Lieutenant General Peter Kirillovich Essen)
 8th Infantry Division (less 7th Jager Regiment)
 Seversk Dragoon Regiment
 Smolensk Dragoon Regiment
 Grekov VIII Don Cossack Regiment
 15th Horse Artillery Company
 8th Pontoon Company
 3rd Corps (Lieutenant General Alexander Voinov)
 10th Infantry Division (less Yaroslavl Infantry Regiment)
 Kinburn Dragoon Regiment
 Belorussian Hussar Regiment
 Melnikov V Don Cossack Regiment
 3rd Ural Cossack Regiment
 4th Ural Cossack Regiment
 38th Artillery Battery
 50th Light Artillery Company
 4th Corps (Lieutenant General Alexander Zass, later replaced by Major General Mikhail Bulatov)
 2nd Brigade and Okhotsk Infantry Regiment of the 16th Infantry Division
 22nd Brigade, Pereyaslavl Dragoon Regiment, and Chuguyev Uhlan Regiment of the 7th Cavalry Division
 39th Artillery Battery
 17th Horse Artillery Company
 Melnikov III Don Cossack Regiment
 Kuteynikov IV Don Cossack Regiment
 Army Reserve (Lieutenant General Ivan Sabaneyev)
 Olonets Infantry Regiment
 Yaroslavl Infantry Regiment
 7th Jager Regiment
 Oliviopol Hussar Regiment
 Lukovkin II Don Cossack Regiment
 16th Horse Artillery Company
 2nd Pioneer Regiment (three companies)

The soldiers of the army had seen much fighting by 1812 and were described by historian Dominic Lieven as "among the best in the Russian army." On  the army included 43,600 men in 71 battalions, 64 squadrons, ten irregular cavalry regiments, and eighteen artillery companies.

References

Citations

Bibliography

See also
 Russian Army order of battle (1812)

Armies of the Russian Empire
Military units and formations established in 1806
Military units and formations disestablished in 1812
Russian military units and formations of the Napoleonic Wars